The Presidential Administration of Kazakhstan is a state body of the Republic of Kazakhstan, established in accordance with presidential decree #2565 on 20 October 1995. It is formed by the President of the Republic, to whom the staff reports directly.

Functions
Ensuring the activities of the President of the Republic of Kazakhstan to determine the main directions of the state's foreign and domestic policy.
Informing the president about the situation in the country and abroad.
Coordination and control of the execution of legislative orders of the President of the Republic of Kazakhstan.
Assessment of the effectiveness of the central executive bodies, akims of regions, cities of republican significance and the capital and development of recommendations for improving their activities.
Implementation of other tasks and works determined by the President.

Heads of the Presidential Administration
 Nurtai Abykayev (1990–1995)
 Saginbek Tursunov (1995–1996)
 Akhmetzhan Yesimov (1996)
 Oralbay Abdykarimov (1996–1997)
 Sarybai Kalmurzaev (1997–1998)
 Vladimir Shepel (1998)
 Akhmetzhan Yesimov (1998)
 Alikhan Baimenov (1998–1999)
 Sarybai Kalmurzaev (1999–2002)
 Nurtai Abykayev (January 29, 2002 – March 10, 2004)
 Imangali Tasmagambetov (March 10 – December 9, 2004)
 Adilbek Dzhaksybekov (December 19, 2004 – January 23, 2008)
 Kairat Kelimbetov (January 23 – October 13, 2008)
 Aslan Musin (October 13, 2008 – September 21, 2012)
 Karim Massimov (September 24, 2012 – April 3, 2014)
 Nurlan Nigmatulin (April 3, 2014 – June 21, 2016)
 Adilbek Dzhaksybekov (June 21, 2016 – September 10, 2018)
 Asset Issekeshev (September 10, 2018 –  March 24, 2019)
 Bakhytzhan Sagintayev (March 24, 2019 – June 28, 2019)
 Krymbek Kusherbayev (June 28, 2019 – September 18, 2019)
 Erlan Qoşanov (September 18, 2019 – 1 February 2022)
 Murat Nurtileu (February 1, 2022 – November 26, 2022 reassigned)

References